Aristotel Koleci (born 23 March 1993) is an Albanian footballer who plays for Besëlidhja Lezhë in the Albanian First Division.

References

1993 births
Living people
People from Mirditë
Association football midfielders
Albanian footballers
FC Kamza players
FK Tomori Berat players
Besëlidhja Lezhë players
Kategoria e Parë players